The Coalition for College, formerly the Coalition for Access, Affordability, and Success (CAAS), is an American nonprofit organization that runs the Coalition Application, a U.S. college application platform. It was founded in 2015, and says it aims to provide a holistic application that assists disadvantaged students. Its main competitor is the more widely used Common Application.

Coalition Application process
Students who apply via the Coalition Application create a portfolio about themselves, starting as early as 9th grade.

Members
The Coalition launched with 83 member schools, which were required to meet a set of criteria for selectivity and access. 56 institutions used it in its first year. , approximately 150 institutions offered it.

Reception
Some higher education experts were intrigued or excited by the application's launch. Others questioned whether it will truly help improve college access.

In 2019, Inside Higher Ed reported widespread complaints that the application was difficult to fill out.

See also
Common Application
College admissions in the United States
Transfer admissions in the United States
Universities and Colleges Admissions Service (UCAS), UK

References

External links

University and college admissions in the United States
2015 establishments in the United States
Non-profit organizations based in the United States